Dayanand Brajendra Swarup College is a college in the south region of Kanpur. It is government aided and is affiliated to CSJM University Kanpur.

Location
It is in the south of Kanpur at Govind Nagar near Govindpuri railway station (North Central Railway).

Facilities
N.C.C.
Research Cell

Courses

Government aided
B.A.: Hindi, English, Economics, History, Sanskrit, Political Science, Sociology, Education, Geography
B.Sc.: Physics, Chemistry, Mathematics/Electronics, Zoology, Botany, Chemistry
M.A.: Economics, English, Hindi, History, Sanskrit, Political Science, Sociology
M.Sc.: Mathematics, Physics, Chemistry, Zoology, Botany

Self finance
B.Lib.Sc.
B.Ed.
B.Com.
B.Sc.: Computer Application, Industrial Microbiology, Electronics, Environmental Science
M.A.: Geography, Education

References

Our Photo Gallery 

Universities and colleges in Kanpur
Colleges affiliated to Chhatrapati Shahu Ji Maharaj University
Educational institutions established in 1959
1959 establishments in Uttar Pradesh